Mesadactylus ('mesa finger') is an extinct genus of pterosaur from the Kimmeridgian-Tithonian-age Upper Jurassic Morrison Formation of Colorado, United States. The genus was named in 1989 by James Jensen and Kevin Padian. The type species is Mesadactylus ornithosphyos.

Classification
The holotype is BYU 2024, a synsacrum of seven sacral vertebrae, featuring a unique—for a pterosaur—complete fusion of the spinae into a supraneural blade, a character, as the specific name indicates more typical for birds, at first leading Jensen to assign the fossil to a bird, Palaeopteryx.

Further referred associated remains include arms bones, pectoral girdle bones, vertebrae (including cervix and sacral), and femora. Additional material was described in 2004 (including a partial braincase) and 2006; in the latter publication, the authors suggested that its larger contemporary Kepodactylus could be the same animal, although there are minor differences.

Jensen and Padian classified Mesadactylus as a pterodactyloid. In 2007 S. Christopher Bennett claimed that the holotype and the referred material came from different forms and that, while the last was indeed of a pterodactyloid nature, the synsacrum belonged to a member of the Anurognathidae.

See also
 List of pterosaur genera
 Timeline of pterosaur research

References

Monofenestratans
Late Jurassic pterosaurs of North America
Morrison fauna
Taxa named by James A. Jensen
Taxa named by Kevin Padian
Fossil taxa described in 1989